Fred van der Hoorn (born 12 October 1963) is a Dutch former footballer who played in defence.

Career
Van der Hoorn joined Dundee United in 1989 from Dutch side FC Den Bosch and stayed at Tannadice until just after United's Scottish Cup win in 1994, although he had fallen out of favour by that time. In June 1994, he moved to Belgium with Eendracht Aalst and later returned to former club Den Bosch in 1996. After retiring in 2002, van der Hoorn stayed with the club in a coaching capacity, becoming caretaker manager for two short spells in 2005 and in 2009.

References

1963 births
Living people
Dutch footballers
Dundee United F.C. players
FC Den Bosch players
Sportspeople from 's-Hertogenbosch
Association football defenders
Eredivisie players
Eerste Divisie players
Belgian Pro League players
Scottish Football League players
Dutch expatriate footballers
Expatriate footballers in Scotland
Scottish Football League representative players
Footballers from North Brabant